Zango is a Local Government Area in Katsina State, Nigeria, sharing a border with the Republic of Niger. Its headquarters are in the town of Zango in the north of the area at.

It has an area of 601 km and a population of 154,743 at the 2006 census.

The postal code of the area is 824.

References

Local Government Areas in Katsina State
Niger–Nigeria border crossings